Liam Firus (born July 2, 1992) is a Canadian retired figure skater. He is the 2016 Triglav Trophy champion and a three-time Canadian national medallist (silver in 2016, bronze in 2014–15). He competed at the 2014 Olympic Games. Earlier in his career, Firus won two bronze medals on the ISU Junior Grand Prix series.

Personal life 
Liam Firus was born July 2, 1992 in North Vancouver, British Columbia. He is the son of Lois Sullivan, a real estate agent, and Trevor Firus, an accountant. He has a younger brother, Shane, who competes in ice dancing.

Firus attended Sentinel Secondary School in West Vancouver. After part-time business administration studies at Capilano University, Firus became a student at Athabasca University, pursuing a Bachelor of Commerce degree with a major in finance. In 2013, he passed the Canadian Securities Course. Since 2014 he has been in a relationship with Canadian pairs figure skater Kirsten Moore-Towers.

Career

Early years 
Firus started skating as a hockey player in 1999 and eventually switched to figure skating. Lorna Bauer began teaching him when he was eight years old. A member of the North Shore's Vancouver Skating Club, he trained in the fall and winter at the Pacific National Exhibition Agrodome and the rest of the year at the Canlan Ice Sports Arena.

During the 2009–2010 season, Firus won the Canadian junior title but was not assigned to the World Junior Championships.

2010–2011 season 
Firus finished 6th in his senior national debut at the 2011 Canadian Championships and was assigned to the World Junior Championships where he finished 20th.

2011–2012 season 
Firus began the 2011–2012 season by winning the bronze medal at the Junior Grand Prix event in Brisbane, Australia.

2012–2013 season 
Firus experienced severe pelvic pain while training for the Canadian Championships. He placed fifth at the event in January 2013. His condition developed into osteitis pubis and he decided to undergo prolotherapy. He resumed training after five months.

2013–2014 season 
In autumn 2013, Firus began training under Christy Krall in Colorado Springs, Colorado. He won bronze at the 2014 Canadian Championships and was named to the Canadian team at the 2014 Winter Olympics. He finished 28th in Sochi.

2014–2015 season 
Firus placed 11th at the 2014 Skate Canada International in Kelowna, British Columbia and won the bronze medal at the 2015 Canadian Championships in Kingston, Ontario. He finished 15th at the 2015 Four Continents Championships.

2015–2016 season 
Firus won silver at the 2016 Canadian Nationals and finished 13th at the 2016 Four Continents Championships. He withdrew from the 2016 World Championships in Boston, stating "Making this decision was extremely difficult. However, I feel that withdrawing from the World Championships is vital for our team."

2016–2017 season 
Ahead of the season, Firus changed coaches, joining Bruno Marcotte in Montreal, Quebec.

2017–2018 season 
Firus won the bronze medal at the 2017 CS Warsaw Cup in Poland. A few days later, he was invited to a Grand Prix event, 2017 Skate America, receiving the call on the Wednesday morning before the event. He officially announced his retirement on May 14, 2018.

Programs

Competitive highlights 
GP: Grand Prix; CS: Challenger Series; JGP: Junior Grand Prix

References

External links 

 

1992 births
Canadian male single skaters
Living people
Olympic figure skaters of Canada
Figure skaters at the 2014 Winter Olympics
Sportspeople from North Vancouver
Capilano University alumni
20th-century Canadian people
21st-century Canadian people